Keehn is a surname. Notable people with the surname include:

Kevin Keehn, American air force reserve brigadier general and commercial airline pilot
Mike Keehn (born 1961), American college baseball coach and player

See also
Keen (surname)